Heyang in Chinese might be represented in different characters referring to

合陽/合阳
 Modern Heyang County, Shaanxi province, PRC.
河陽/河阳
 The historical name of Mengzhou, Henan province. 
 Heyang Township in Guizhou Province (:zh:河阳乡)